The Metal Years may refer to:

The Decline of Western Civilization Part II: The Metal Years, 1988 documentary film
Career of Evil: The Metal Years,  1990 album by Blue Öyster Cult
The Metal Years (album), 2008 album by band London, live recorded session that took place in 1989 right after their appearance in The Decline of Western Civilization Part II: The Metal Years